Henry I of Castile (14 April 1204 – 6 June 1217) was king of Castile. He was the son of Alfonso VIII of Castile and Eleanor of England, Queen of Castile (daughter of Henry II of England and Eleanor of Aquitaine). He was the brother of Berenguela and Mafalda of Castile.

In 1211, Henry became heir to the throne when his older brother Ferdinand suddenly died.

When his father died in 1214, Henry was just 10 years old, so the regency was assumed by Henry's older sister Berengaria of Castile, wife of Alfonso IX of Leon.

In 1215, Henry married Mafalda of Portugal, daughter of Sancho I of Portugal. As he was very young, the marriage was not consummated, and it was dissolved in 1216 by Pope Innocent III on grounds of consanguinity. In the same year, Henry became betrothed to his second cousin Sancha, heiress of León.

Henry died in Palencia in 1217 at the age of 13, killed by a tile coming off a roof. His sister Berengaria succeeded him, before renouncing the throne in favour of her son Ferdinand III. His body was buried at Las Huelgas monastery in Burgos.

Notes

References

 Charles William Previté-Orton, The shorter Cambridge Medieval History, Cambridge University Press, 1952.
 Taylor, Craig, Debating the Hundred Years War, Cambridge University Press, 2006.

Castilian House of Burgundy
Monarchs who died as children
Medieval child monarchs
1204 births
1217 deaths
13th-century Castilian monarchs
Accidental deaths in Spain
Burials at the Abbey of Santa María la Real de Las Huelgas
Spanish people of English descent
Castilian infantes